Hindu texts are manuscripts and voluminous historical literature which are related to any of the diverse traditions within Hinduism. A few of these texts are shared across these traditions and they are broadly considered Hindu scriptures. These include the Itihasa and Vedas. Scholars hesitate in defining the term "Hindu scriptures" given the diverse nature of Hinduism, but many list the Agamas as Hindu scriptures, and Dominic Goodall includes Bhagavata Purana and Yajnavalkya Smriti in the list of Hindu scriptures as well.

History
There are two historic classifications of Hindu texts: Śruti – that which is heard, and Smriti – that which is remembered. The Shruti refers to the body of most authoritative, ancient religious texts, believed to be eternal knowledge authored neither by human nor divine agent but transmitted by sages (rishis). These comprise the central canon of Hinduism. It includes the four Vedas including its four types of embedded texts - the Samhitas, the Brahmanas, the Aranyakas and the early Upanishads. Of the Shrutis (Vedic corpus), the Upanishads alone are widely influential among Hindus, considered scriptures par excellence of Hinduism, and their central ideas have continued to influence its thoughts and traditions.

The Smriti texts are a specific body of Hindu texts attributed to an author, as a derivative work they are considered less authoritative than Shruti in Hinduism. The Smriti literature is a vast corpus of diverse texts, and includes but is not limited to Vedāngas, the Hindu epics, the Sutras and Shastras, the texts of Hindu philosophies, the Puranas, the Kāvya or poetical literature, the Bhasyas, and numerous Nibandhas (digests) covering politics, ethics, culture, arts and society.

Many ancient and medieval Hindu texts were composed in Sanskrit, many others in regional Indian languages. In modern times, most ancient texts have been translated into other Indian languages and some in non-Indian languages. Prior to the start of the common era, the Hindu texts were composed orally, then memorized and transmitted orally, from one generation to next, for more than a millennia before they were written down into manuscripts. This verbal tradition of preserving and transmitting Hindu texts, from one generation to next, continued into the modern era.

Vedas

The Vedas are a large body of Hindu texts originating in Vedic period in northern India, the Rig Veda being composed ca. 1200 BCE, and its Samhita and Brahmanas complete before about 800 BCE. Composed in Vedic Sanskrit hymns, the texts constitute the oldest layer of Sanskrit literature and the oldest scriptures of Hinduism. Hindus consider the Vedas to be timeless revelation, apauruṣeya, which means "not of a man, superhuman" and "impersonal, authorless". The knowledge in the Vedas is believed in Hinduism to be eternal, uncreated, neither authored by human nor by divine source, but seen, heard and transmitted by sages.

Vedas are also called  ("what is heard") literature, distinguishing them from other religious texts, which are called  ("what is remembered"). The Veda, for orthodox Indian theologians, are considered revelations, some way or other the work of the Deity. In the Hindu Epic the Mahabharata, the creation of Vedas is credited to Brahma.

There are four Vedas: the Rigveda, the Yajurveda, the Samaveda and the Atharvaveda. Each Veda has been subclassified into four major text types – the Samhitas (mantras and benedictions), the Aranyakas (text on rituals, ceremonies, sacrifices and symbolic-sacrifices), the Brahmanas (commentaries on rituals, ceremonies and sacrifices), and the Upanishads (text discussing meditation, philosophy and spiritual knowledge).

Upanishads

The Upanishads are a collection of Hindu texts which contain some of the central philosophical concepts of Hinduism.

The Upanishads are commonly referred to as Vedānta, variously interpreted to mean either the "last chapters, parts of the Veda" or "the object, the highest purpose of the Veda". The concepts of Brahman (Ultimate Reality) and Ātman (Soul, Self) are central ideas in all the Upanishads, and "Know your Ātman" their thematic focus. The Upanishads are the foundation of Hindu philosophical thought and its diverse traditions. Of the Vedic corpus, they alone are widely known, and the central ideas of the Upanishads have had a lasting influence on Hindu philosophy.

More than 200 Upanishads are known, of which the first dozen or so are the oldest and most important and are referred to as the principal or main (mukhya) Upanishads. The mukhya Upanishads are found mostly in the concluding part of the Brahmanas and Aranyakas and were, for centuries, memorized by each generation and passed down verbally. The early Upanishads all predate the Common Era, some in all likelihood pre-Buddhist (6th century BCE), down to the Maurya period. Of the remainder, some 95 Upanishads are part of the Muktika canon, composed from about the start of common era through medieval Hinduism. New Upanishads, beyond the 108 in the Muktika canon, continued being composed through the early modern and modern era, though often dealing with subjects unconnected to Hinduism.

Smriti

The texts that appeared afterwards were called smriti. Smriti is a  literature which includes various Shastras and Itihasas (epics like Ramayana, Mahabharata), Harivamsa Puranas, Agamas and Darshanas.

The Sutras and Shastras texts were compilations of technical or specialized knowledge in a defined area. The earliest are dated to later half of the 1st millennium BCE. The Dharma-shastras (law books), derivatives of the Dharma-sutras. Other examples were bhautikashastra "physics", rasayanashastra "chemistry", jīvashastra "biology", vastushastra "architectural science", shilpashastra "science of sculpture", arthashastra "economics" and nītishastra "political science". It also includes Tantras and Agama literature.

This genre of texts includes the Sutras and Shastras of the six schools of Hindu philosophy: Samkhya, Yoga, Nyaya, Vaisheshika, Mimamsa and Vedanta.

Puranas

The Puranas are a vast genre of Hindu texts that encyclopedically cover a wide range of topics, particularly legends and other traditional lore. Composed primarily in Sanskrit, but also in regional languages, several of these texts are named after major Hindu deities such as Lord Vishnu, Lord Shiva and Goddess Devi.

The Puranic literature is encyclopedic, and it includes diverse topics such as cosmogony, cosmology, genealogies of gods, goddesses, kings, heroes, sages, and demigods, folk tales, pilgrimages, temples, medicine, astronomy, grammar, mineralogy, humor, love stories, as well as theology and philosophy. The content is diverse across the Puranas, and each Purana has survived in numerous manuscripts which are themselves voluminous and comprehensive. The Hindu Puranas are anonymous texts and likely the work of many authors over the centuries; in contrast, most Jaina Puranas can be dated and their authors assigned.

There are 18 Maha Puranas (Great Puranas) and 18 Upa Puranas (Minor Puranas), with over 400,000 verses. The Puranas do not enjoy the authority of a scripture in Hinduism, but are considered a Smriti. These Hindu texts have been influential in the Hindu culture, inspiring major national and regional annual festivals of Hinduism. The Bhagavata Purana has been among the most celebrated and popular text in the Puranic genre.

Other Hindu texts
Hindu texts for specific fields, in Sanskrit and other regional languages, have been reviewed as follows:

Historical significance
The Hindu scriptures provide the early documented history of arts and science forms in India such as music, dance, sculptures, architecture, astronomy, science, mathematics, medicine and wellness. Valmiki's Ramayana (500 BCE to 100 BCE) mentions music and singing by Gandharvas, dance by Apsaras such as Urvashi, Rambha, Menaka, Tilottama Panchāpsaras, and by Ravana's wives who excelling in nrityageeta or "singing and dancing" and nritavaditra or "playing musical instruments"). The evidence of earliest dance related texts are in Natasutras, which are mentioned in the text of Panini, the sage who wrote the classic on Sanskrit grammar, and who is dated to about 500 BCE. This performance arts related Sutra text is mentioned in other late Vedic texts, as are two scholars names Shilalin (IAST: Śilālin) and Krishashva (Kṛśaśva), credited to be pioneers in the studies of ancient drama, singing, dance and Sanskrit compositions for these arts. Richmond et al. estimate the Natasutras to have been composed around 600 BCE, whose complete manuscript has not survived into the modern age.

See also
Rigveda
Yajurveda
Samaveda

Indian epic poetry
Hindu eschatology
List of Hindu texts
List of historic Indian texts
Sutra
Prasthanatrayi
Sanskrit literature
Timeline of Hindu texts

Notes

References

Bibliography

Further reading
 R.C. Zaehner (1992), Hindu Scriptures, Penguin Random House, 
 Dominic Goodall, Hindu Scriptures, University of California Press, 
 Jessica Frazier (2014), The Bloomsbury Companion to Hindu studies, Bloomsbury Academic,

External links
Manuscripts collections (incomplete)
A handlist of Sanskrit and Prakrit Hindu, Buddhist and Jain Manuscripts held by the Wellcome Library, Volume 1, Compiled by Dominik Wujastyk (Includes subjects such as historic Dictionaries, Drama, Erotics, Ethics, Logic, Poetics, Medicine, Philosophy, etc.)
A handlist of Sanskrit and Prakrit Hindu, Buddhist and Jain Manuscripts held by the Wellcome Library, Volume 2, Compiled by Dominik Wujastyk (Includes subjects such as historic Dictionaries, Drama, Erotics, Ethics, Logic, Poetics, Medicine, Philosophy, etc.; for complete 6 set collection see )
Clay Sanskrit Library publishes Sanskrit literature with downloadable materials.
 The Sacred Books of the Hindus Information
Online resources:
The British Library: Discovering Sacred Texts - Hinduism
Sacred-Texts: Hinduism
Sanskrit Documents Collection: Documents in ITX format of Upanishads, Stotras etc.
GRETIL: Göttingen Register of Electronic Texts in Indian Languages, a cumulative register of the numerous download sites for electronic texts in Indian languages.